The 2013 ICC East Asia-Pacific Men's Championship was played between 3–7 February 2013 in Auckland, New Zealand. The tournament was a Twenty20 competition with the winner promoted to the 2013 ICC World Twenty20 Qualifier in the United Arab Emirates.

Teams
Teams that qualified are as follows:

Teams of Philippines and South Korea did not participate due to their implementation of the wrong selection policy, whereas the team from Tonga pulled out due to political squabbles in the board.

Squads

Fixtures

Group stage

Points table

Matches

Final

Statistics

Most Runs
The top five run scorers (total runs) are included in this table.

Most Wickets
The top five wicket takers (total wickets) are listed in this table.

See also

2013 ICC World Twenty20 Qualifier
World Cricket League Africa Region

References

2014 ICC World Twenty20
2012–13 New Zealand cricket season